Metallanchista perlaeta is a species of black coloured ground beetle in the Lebiinae subfamily that can be found in such Asian countries as Malaysia and Indonesian islands such as Java and Sumatra.

References

Beetles described in 1994
Beetles of Asia